Última Hora (Last Hour) is a Spanish language newspaper published in Nuevo Laredo, Tamaulipas, Mexico. The newspaper was founded on July 26, 1996, as Dos, Enlace de Culturas by Benjamín Galván Gómez. The name was changed to Ultima Hora on November 13, 1998. The newspaper is printed daily at 5:00 PM CST to ensure the latest news is read and the newspaper is sold until 10:30 AM CST. Última Hora is also circulated in Laredo, Texas, United States.

See also
 List of newspapers in Mexico

References

External links
Ultima Hora official website
Ultima Hora Online Edition

1996 establishments in Mexico
Mass media in Nuevo Laredo
Newspapers published in Mexico
Publications established in 1996
Spanish-language newspapers